New Kids on the Block is the debut studio album from American pop boy band New Kids on the Block released in 1986. The album failed to garner any attention at the time of its release.  In August 1989, during the success of their second album, Hangin' Tough, Columbia Records released the New Kids on the Block track "Didn't I (Blow Your Mind)" as a single, in an attempt to bring this album to the attention of the group's growing fan-base. The ploy worked, and albums sales spiked, causing it to be released outside the United States around the same time. Subsequently, the New Kids on the Block album would eventually be certified 3× Platinum by the RIAA, peaking at number 25 on the US Billboard 200.

Track listing

Personnel 
New Kids on the Block
Jordan Knight – lead and backing vocals
Jonathan Knight – lead and backing vocals
Joey McIntyre – lead and backing vocals
Donnie Wahlberg – lead and backing vocals
Danny Wood – lead and backing vocals

Production
Maurice Starr – producer and all instruments
Larkin Arnold – executive producer
Erik Nuri – executive producer
Christopher Austopchuk – art direction
Paul Arnold – engineer
Phil Greene – engineer, mixing
Caroline Greyshock – photography
Jimmy Johnson – conga
Frank Heller – engineer, mixing
Gordon Worthy – keyboards
Phaedra Butler – backing vocals and duet vocals on "Don't Give Up on Me"
Pat Costa – engineer
William Garrett – engineer
Sidney Burton – engineer, mixing
Christopher Rich – beat box

Charts

Weekly charts

Year-end charts

Certifications and sales

Footnotes 
The group was originally named Nynuk. The name was changed to New Kids on the Block following the recording of the Donnie Wahlberg-written album track of the same name.

References 

1986 debut albums
New Kids on the Block albums
Albums produced by Maurice Starr